The Scottish Championship, known as the cinch Championship for sponsorship reasons, is the second tier of the Scottish Professional Football League, the league competition for men's professional football clubs in Scotland. The Scottish Championship was established in July 2013, after the Scottish Professional Football League was formed by a merger of the Scottish Premier League and Scottish Football League.

Format
Teams receive three points for a win and one point for a draw. No points are awarded for a loss. Teams are ranked by total points, then goal difference, and then goals scored. At the end of each season, the club with the most points is crowned league champion. If points are equal, the goal difference determines the winner. If this still does not result in a winner, the tied teams must take part in a playoff game at a neutral venue to determine the final placings.

Promotion and relegation
The champions are directly promoted to the Scottish Premiership, swapping places with the bottom club of the Premiership.
The clubs finishing 2nd, 3rd and 4th then enter the two-legged Premiership play-off. The 3rd-placed club plays the 4th-placed club, with the winner then playing the 2nd-placed club. The winner of that game then plays against the 11th-placed Premiership club. If the Championship play-off winner prevails, the club is promoted and the Premiership club is relegated; otherwise, the Premiership club remains in its league while the Championship club is not promoted.

For promotion and relegation, the Championship play-off system closely mirrors its Premiership counterpart—the bottom-ranked club in the Championship is automatically relegated while the 9th-placed club undergoes a play-off with the 2nd, 3rd and 4th placed clubs from League One.

Teams
Listed below are all the teams competing in the 2022–23 Scottish Championship season, with details of the first season they entered the second tier; the first season of their current spell in the second tier; and the last time they won the second tier.

Stadiums

Statistics

Championships

Records and awards

 Biggest home win Heart of Midlothian 10–0 Cowdenbeath, 28 February 2015
 Biggest away win Dumbarton 0–6 Rangers, 2 January 2016;
 Most points in a season 91; Heart of Midlothian, 2014–15
 Fewest points in a season 4; Brechin City, 2017–18
 Fewest goals scored in a season 20; Brechin City, 2017–18
 Most goals scored in a season 96; Heart of Midlothian, 2014–15
 Most goals conceded in a season 90; Brechin City, 2017–18
 Fewest goals conceded in a season 25; Hibernian, 2016–17
 Highest attendance 50,349; Rangers 1–1 Alloa Athletic, 23 April 2016
 Lowest attendance 318; Cowdenbeath 3–0 Greenock Morton, 25 March 2014

Top goalscorers

 
Italics denotes players still playing professional football,Bold denotes players still playing in the Scottish Chamionpship.

Broadcasting rights

Notes

References

External links
 Scottish Championship – Official website

 
2013 establishments in Scotland
2
Professional sports leagues in Scotland
Championship
Second level football leagues in Europe
Sports leagues established in 2013